Nyengo (Nhengo) is a minor Bantu language of Angola.

References

Chokwe-Luchazi languages
Languages of Angola